The Red River is a  tributary of the Kentucky River in east-central Kentucky in the United States. Via the Kentucky and Ohio rivers, it is part of the Mississippi River watershed.

It flows generally west, through Red River Gorge in the Daniel Boone National Forest, then past Stanton and Clay City.

In 1993, a  stretch of the river in the Red River Gorge was designated by the federal government as a National Wild and Scenic River.

The book The Unforeseen Wilderness by Wendell Berry was written to deter the Army Corps of Engineers from damming the Red River Gorge in 1971.

Recreation
The largest golden redhorse ever taken in Kentucky (4 lbs., 5 oz.) was taken in the Red River.

See also
Clifty Wilderness
List of rivers of Kentucky

References

External links
The Red River Gorge Today
U.S. Forest Service: Red River Gorge
The Red River Saga
RRS: Red River Gorge Biodiversity
Arches of the Red River Gorge
Red River Gorge Geologic Area
Wild and Scenic Red River

Rivers of Kentucky
Rivers of Wolfe County, Kentucky
Rivers of Clay County, Kentucky
Rivers of Powell County, Kentucky
Rivers of Clark County, Kentucky
Wild and Scenic Rivers of the United States